Avaghachi Sansar is an Indian Marathi-language television series which aired on Zee Marathi. It is Zee Marathi's fourth longest running soap opera on Marathi Television shows. Due to its popularity, the show reran on Zee Yuva from 24 August 2020.

Cast

Main
 Prasad Oak as Harshwardhan Bhosale (Harsh)
 Amruta Subhash as Asawari Harshwardhan Bhosale / Asawari Raghunath Mohite 
 Kadambari Kadam as Antara Raghunath Mohite; Asawari's sister

Recurring
 Suhita Thatte as Sudha Raghunath Mohite
 Vandana Sardesai-Waknis as Uma Dhananjay Mohite
 Sanjay Mone as Dhananjay Mohite; Raghunath's brother
 Vihang Nayak as Raghunath Mohite; School's principal
 Anand Abhyankar replaced Vihang as Raghunath Mohite
 Neha Joshi as Sanyogita Bhosale; Harsh's sister
 Dipti Devi as Neha Dhananjay Mohite; Asawari and Antara's sister
 Hemangi Kavi as Sakshi; Antara's friend
 Suruchi Adarkar as Harsh's office receptionist
 Neha Bam as Mrs. Gore
 Aadesh Bandekar as Mr. Mayekar
 Shriram Kolhatkar as Mr. Ghare (Bank Manager)
 Sarika Nilatkar as Mrs. Lad
 Subodh Bhave as Raj Sharangpani
 Pankaj Vishnu as Sachin Mhatre; Asawari's fiance
 Arun Nalawade as Dhanaji Mane
 Dipti Ketkar as Sharada Raje

Other
 Samidha Guru
 Pushkar Shrotri
 Shweta Shinde
 Ashok Shinde
 Chinmay Mandlekar
 Avinash Narkar
 Ajay Purkar
 Aniket Kelkar
 Vidyadhar Joshi
 Sunil Godbole
 Manasi Magikar
 Uday Sabnis
 Kishor Mahabole

Awards

References

External links 
 
 
 Avaghachi Sansar at ZEE5

Marathi-language television shows
Zee Marathi original programming
2006 Indian television series debuts
2010 Indian television series endings